Rafinha is the diminutive form of the given name Rafael. It can refer to:

Brazilian association football players
 Rafinha (footballer, born 1982), Rafael Scapini de Almeida, midfielder and defender
 Rafinha (footballer, born 1983), Rafael da Silva Francisco, midfielder
 Rafinha (footballer, born 1985), Márcio Rafael Ferreira de Souza, right-back
 Rafinha (footballer, born 1987), Rafael dos Santos de Oliveira, striker
 Rafinha (footballer, born April 1988), Rafael Chagas Machado, left-back
 Rafinha (footballer, born 11 August 1988), Rafael Viana de Melo, left-back
 Rafinha (footballer, born 18 August 1988) (born 1988), Rafaela de Miranda Travalão, midfielder
 Rafinha (footballer, born 1989), Rafael Junior dos Santos Freire, midfielder
 Rafinha (footballer, born 1990), Rafael Gomes de Oliveira, midfielder
 Rafinha (footballer, born March 1992), Rafael de Sá Rodrigues, forward
 Rafinha (footballer, born June 1992), Rafael Diniz Alves e Silva, attacking midfielder
 Rafinha (footballer, born February 1993), Rafael Alcântara do Nascimento, midfielder
 Rafinha (footballer, born April 1993), Rafael Lima Pereira, winger
 Rafinha (footballer, born July 1993), Rafael Gimenes da Silva, defensive midfielder
 Raphinha (born 1996), Raphael Dias Bellol, winger
 Raphinha (footballer, born 1993), Raphael David Thomaz, defender

Other people
 Rafinha Cunha (born 1992), Sandro Rafael Veiga Cunha, Portuguese winger
 Rafael Rebello (born 1980), Brazilian mixed martial artist

Nicknames in association football